Richard Cheatham (February 20, 1799 – September 9, 1845) was an American politician in Middle Tennessee. He was elected as a Whig in 1836 from Tennessee's 11th congressional district to the United States House of Representatives, serving one term. He had previously served several terms in Tennessee's State House, from 1825 to 1833.

Biography
Cheatham was born in Springfield, Tennessee, on February 20, 1799. After completing preparatory studies, he went to work. He engaged in mercantile pursuits, stock raising, and operating a cotton gin. He married Susan Saunders.

Career
Cheatham soon became politically active and was first elected to the Tennessee House of Representatives in 1824, at the age of 25. He served several terms, from 1825 to 1833. He was a member of the State constitutional convention which met at Nashville from May 19 to August 30, 1834. He was Presidential Elector for Tennessee in 1836. He served in the State militia with the rank of general.

Cheatham ran for Congress three successive times before being elected in 1836 as a Whig to the Twenty-fifth Congress, which lasted from March 4, 1837 to March 3, 1839.  He failed to be re-elected to the Twenty-sixth or Twenty-seventh Congresses. He resumed his former business pursuits.

Death
While visiting at White's Creek Springs near Springfield, Tennessee, Cheatham died on September 9, 1845 (age 46 years, 201 days).  He was interred at Old City Cemetery. His widow and eldest son, Edward, continued his businesses.  His remains were reinterred at Elmwood Cemetery in 1952. Cheatham County was named after his son, Edward Saunders Cheatham.

References

External links

1799 births
1845 deaths
People from Springfield, Tennessee
Businesspeople from Tennessee
Members of the Tennessee House of Representatives
Whig Party members of the United States House of Representatives from Tennessee
19th-century American politicians
Cheatham family
19th-century American businesspeople